Dame Marcella Althea Liburd,  (born 10 July 1953) is a Kittitian politician who is the fifth governor-general of Saint Kitts and Nevis, serving since 2023. Trained as a teacher and then as a barrister and solicitor, Liburd was the first woman to serve as both the Speaker of the National Assembly of Saint Kitts and Nevis and the Governor-General. She has served in various Ministerial positions including Acting Prime Minister and Chair of the Opposition for the Labour Party. She was the first woman to serve as Chair in the 81-year-old organization’s history.

Early life
Marcella Liburd was born on 10 July 1953 in Basseterre, Saint Kitts, St. Kitts and Nevis to Anne Eliza (née Martin) and Clement Liburd. After attending Basseterre Girls School, Liburd graduated from Basseterre High School. She earned her Bachelor of Arts from the University of the West Indies in 1976.

Career
Liburd returned from abroad and began teaching at Basseterre and Cayon High Schools. She returned to her own studies, obtaining a Bachelor of Law with honours in 1992 from Norman Manley Law School (NMLS) where she continued her education, earning a Legal Education Certificate from NMLS in 1994. After Liburd's admission as a barrister and solicitor for the Eastern Supreme Court in 1994, she began a political career. She was appointed as Secretary of the Labour Party in 1997. In 2004, she became Speaker of the National Assembly, the first woman to serve in that capacity in the country. Liburd served until 2008, when she ran as a candidate for Constituency No. 2, St. Kitts and was elected as a Member of Parliament.

Liburd has drafted legislation that includes the Domestic Violence Act and Equal Pay Act. She has served as the Minister of Health, Social Services, Community Development, Culture and Gender Affairs, as well as Acting Prime Minister. In 2011, Liburd was featured in an exhibit promoted by various departments of the Government of Saint Kitts and Nevis to highlight prominent women's accomplishments.

In 2013, Liburd became the first woman elected as Chair of the Labour Party in its 81-year history. In 2015, the Labor Party was removed from office for the first time in twenty years, making her a member of the Opposition. She became the first woman deputy leader of the National Labor Party in 2018 and was appointed as Governor-General’s Deputy in 2022. Liburd was installed as the first woman to become Governor-General for the Federation of St Kitts and Nevis on 1 February 2023. Later that week, she was appointed Dame Grand Cross of the Order of St Michael and St George (GCMG).

References

Citations

Bibliography

See also 
 First women lawyers around the world

1953 births
Living people
People from Basseterre
Women lawyers
Governors-General of Saint Kitts and Nevis
Dames Grand Cross of the Order of St Michael and St George
Women government ministers of Saint Kitts and Nevis
Culture ministers of Saint Kitts and Nevis
Health ministers of Saint Kitts and Nevis
Saint Kitts and Nevis Labour Party politicians
Justices of the peace
Members of the National Assembly (Saint Kitts and Nevis)
Women's rights activists
20th-century women politicians
21st-century women politicians
Women legislative speakers
Speakers of the National Assembly (Saint Kitts and Nevis)
Saint Kitts and Nevis people of Antigua and Barbuda descent